This article provides details of international football games played by the Mexico national football team from 2020 to present.

Results

2020

2021

2022

2023

Head to head records

Notes

References

Football in Mexico
Mexico national football team results
2020s in Mexican sports